The Celebrity Big Brother racism controversy was a series of events related to incidents of racist behaviour by contestants on the fifth series of the British reality television show Celebrity Big Brother, broadcast on British television station Channel 4 in January 2007. The controversy centred on comments made by British contestants Jade Goody, Jackiey Budden, Danielle Lloyd, and Jo O'Meara, concerning Indian contestant Shilpa Shetty. The screening of these comments on UK television resulted in national and international media coverage, responses from the UK and Indian governments, and the show's suspension during the 2008 season.

Many agencies and corporations cancelled their contracts with the housemates accused of racism, citing the allegations as the reason for the terminations. Also, many sponsors of the Big Brother series cancelled their sponsorship of the show. After the show, Goody stated that she understood her comments appeared as racist and apologised for any offence caused. Shetty later told the media that she forgave Goody. After conducting an investigation, Ofcom ruled that Channel 4 had breached the Broadcasting Code, and statutory sanctions were placed on the network.

Summary of events in Celebrity Big Brother 5 

The fifth UK series of Celebrity Big Brother began on Wednesday 3 January 2007.  On the first day, eleven celebrity housemates entered the Big Brother House, including model Danielle Lloyd, S Club 7 singer Jo O'Meara and Bollywood actress Shilpa Shetty. Then, on Friday 5, former Big Brother housemate Jade Goody entered the house, accompanied by her boyfriend Jack Tweed and her mother Jackiey Budden. Each day, Channel 4 broadcast a daily "highlights" show, featuring selected events of the previous 24 hours in the House, which itself was repeated the following morning, although offensive language and other potentially objectionable content was removed for pre-watershed broadcasting.

During Budden's stay in the house, she and Shetty clashed on numerous occasions. Budden claimed that she was unable to pronounce the name "Shilpa", and referred to Shetty as "Princess" and "the Indian". During her eviction interview on Wednesday 10 January, after Budden used the term "the Indian", presenter Davina McCall did not question her use of the term – but focussed instead on Budden's failure to pronounce "Shilpa" properly. After Budden's eviction, Goody's boyfriend Jack Tweed called Shetty a "cunt", which was bleeped for broadcast, and a wanker. The night that Carole Malone was evicted, Lloyd referred to Shetty as a "dog".
 

The following day, Shetty cooked a chicken meal for her fellow housemates. According to Lloyd and O’Meara, Shetty had undercooked the chicken. When they suggested that chicken may be cooked differently in India, O'Meara said "That's why they're all thin, because they're sick all the time, because they're ill." Lloyd also mentioned that she did not like Shetty touching her food because she did not "know where her hands have been".
 
The tensions in the house came to a peak on Tuesday 16 January, when an explosive argument between Shetty and Goody erupted, seemingly over Oxo Cubes. During this argument, Goody told Shetty that she was "no fucking princess here", "normal" and needed "a day in the slums", while Shetty told Goody that she needed "etiquette classes" and that her "claim to fame was [Big Brother]". Lloyd and O'Meara laughed throughout the exchange and, when the argument had abated, Lloyd said: "I think she should fuck off home. [...] Does that mean that I need elocution lessons, because she can't understand what I fucking say? She can't even speak English properly anyway."
 
After the argument, Shetty asked fellow housemates if they thought they were "reacting to [her] like this because [she was] Indian". In a conversation with Cleo Rocos, who contested the idea that the others' motivation was racism, Shetty replied: "It is, I'm telling you." However, in a later Diary Room conversation with Big Brother, she retracted this statement.
 

The next morning, in a conversation with Lloyd, Goody referred to Shetty as "Shilpa Poppadom", a reference to an Indian flatbread, along with a number of other things. Following this exchange, Goody was called to the Diary Room to explain her comment, where she clarified that she had not meant it with racist intent. The following day, Big Brother called Goody back to the Diary Room, where she was informed that: "Big Brother will not tolerate any racist behaviour or anything that could be seen as racist behaviour." Goody then discussed the "poppadom" comment directly with Shetty, amongst other grievances the two had with each other. Finally, Goody apologised to Shetty, and Shetty apologised to Goody.
 
On Friday 19 January, Goody was eliminated from the competition by public vote (receiving 82% of the votes to evict), and left the House. Following O’Meara, Lloyd and Tweed's eventual evictions from the House, Shetty became the winner of the show on Sunday 28 January, with 63% of the public vote.

Response

Viewer complaints 

On 15 January, it was reported that media regulator Ofcom was investigating "approximately 200 complaints of racism" received by them. Following the broadcast of Lloyd and O'Meara's conversation about cooking in India, this number increased to 3,500 complaints, with a further 1,000 complaining to Channel 4 directly. By 5pm on Tuesday 16, the complaint figures stood at 10,000 to Ofcom, and 2,000 to Channel 4.
 
On 18 January – the day after the episode that included their argument over Oxo Cubes, Lloyd's subsequent "fuck off home" remark and Shetty voicing her concern about potential racism – the chief executive of Ofcom, Ed Richards, stated that 25,000 complaints had been received, calling it a "UK record". Later that day, Channel 4's chief executive, Andy Duncan, spoke about the events of the series. He said that Channel 4 was "very concerned by the number of complaints and some of the surrounding discussion and complaint", and opined that "the level of complaint and comment shows the programme has touched a real nerve." In addition, directory inquiry service 118 118 received "1,058 angry callers" during Wednesday's broadcast, which was after Shetty's statement was shown.
 
By 20 January, the day after Goody's eviction, the number of complaints stood at 40,000. The final figure was clarified by Ofcom as "just over" 44,500 complaints. As of 2021, this is the British television broadcast with the second highest number of complaints.

Media reaction 
The controversy generated over 300 newspaper articles in Britain, 1,200 in English newspapers around the globe, 3,900 foreign language news articles, and 22,000 blog postings on the internet.
 
British tabloid newspapers were vitriolic towards Goody, Lloyd and O'Meara during their stay in the house – particularly towards Goody. The Daily Mirror ran a front-page editorial entitled "Beauty V Bigot", referring to her as a "racist bully". They later referred to Goody as a "vile racist", and to Lloyd as Goody's "partner-in-crime". In the same print, they misquoted Goody as saying "Go back to the slums" – she actually said "You need a day in the slums". 
 
The BBC became the subject of complaints after making the controversy its lead story, on the same day that Ruth Turner was arrested for her involvement in the Cash for Honours scandal.

Political reaction in UK and India 
Leicester East MP Keith Vaz tabled an Early Day Motion in Parliament addressing this issue. The controversy coincided with a visit by the Chancellor of the Exchequer Gordon Brown to India. When questioned by journalists, he said: "I want Britain to be seen as a country of fairness and tolerance. Anything detracting from this I condemn." Prime Minister Tony Blair refused to comment on the issue as he had not seen the programme, although he did "condemn racism in all its forms." London mayor Ken Livingstone stated, "The racism towards Shilpa Shetty on Celebrity Big Brother is completely unacceptable". He went on to accuse the producers of the programme of selectively editing the show "to broadcast participants' racist comments".
 
Anand Sharma, India's junior minister for external affairs, told journalists that the Indian government would take "appropriate measures" once more information became available, while Kamal Nath, India's trade minister, reportedly said that Celebrity Big Brother could lead to a "diplomatic crisis".
 
Equality and Human Rights Commission chairman Trevor Phillips stated that Channel 4 must "make clear that they got it wrong, they intervened too little too late". A small protest involving "dozens" of Shetty's fans took place in Patna, eastern India, during which straw effigies of Big Brother producers were burned. Priya Ranjan Dasmunsi, India's information and broadcasting minister, opined that Shetty should appear before the Indian high commission in London when she left the house, stating: "If there has been some racism shown against her in the show, it is not only an attack on women but also on the skin and the country." The India Tourism Office placed an "open letter" to Goody as advertisements in several national newspapers, inviting her to "experience the healing nature of India".

Sponsor and corporate backlash 
On 18 January, The Carphone Warehouse suspended its sponsorship of Celebrity Big Brother with immediate effect over the alleged racism, before permanently ending its contract with Channel 4 altogether. Speaking about the suspension, the company's chief executive, Charles Dunstone, stated:
Our concern has rapidly mounted about the broadcast behaviour of individuals within the Big Brother house. We are totally against all forms of racism and bullying and indeed this behaviour is entirely at odds with the brand values of the Carphone Warehouse. As a result we feel that as long as this continues we are unable to associate our brand with the programme. We had already made it clear to Channel 4 that were this to continue, we would have to consider our position. Nothing we saw last night gave us any comfort. Accordingly we have instructed Channel 4 to remove our sponsorship name and branding with immediate effect.
 
Other sponsors of the show, including Beauty-boxes.com, Zamya, United Biscuits, Cobra Beer, Cow & Gate and Moneysupermarket.com withdrew sponsorship from the programme. Vanni Treves, Channel 4's former chairman, urged Channel 4 to cancel the show, while Hertsmere Borough Council, the owners of Big Brother'''s studios in Borehamwood, threatened to refuse permission to film.
 
Fragrance chain The Perfume Shop, pharmacy chain Boots, and Debenhams department stores withdrew Jade Goody's brand of perfume, Shh..., from their stores. HarperCollins cancelled plans to publish the paperback version of Jade Goody's autobiography. The book, titled Jade: My Autobiography was published in hardback in May 2006, and had been scheduled to be released in paperback on 5 February 2007.

Act Against Bullying, a charity supported by Goody, dropped all mention of her from their website citing the racism allegations as the cause. Motorcycle insurance company Bennetts also terminated its six-figure agreement with Danielle to be the official model for their company, citing the racism allegations for this termination.

 Response by Channel 4 
On 16 January, after thousands of complaints had been received, Channel 4 issued the following statement:Matters of bullying or racial abuse in any form are taken extremely seriously by Channel 4 and Endemol. The nature of the show often includes incidents where conflicts arise and housemates are encouraged to resolve issues among themselves. Housemates are closely monitored at all times to ensure they have the appropriate support inside the house which includes being able to talk in confidence to producers. Shilpa herself has not voiced any concerns of racial slurs or bullying against her. Appropriate measures to reprimand individual behaviour would take place where necessary.In spite of this, complaints figures continued to rise, leading the network to issue another statement the following day. They denied that any "overt racial abuse or racist behaviour" had occurred, but acknowledged that a "cultural and class clash between [Shetty] and three of the British females" had.
 
It is typical on Big Brother that live evictions are attended by a large crowd gathered outside the House and, following their interview with Davina McCall, evicted housemates then attend a press conference. Channel 4 announced on the afternoon of the eviction that both events had been cancelled, and that all profits from the vote to evict that week would be donated to charity.
 
On 22 January, Channel 4's board of directors held a meeting to discuss the issue. Following the meeting, its chairman issued the following statement:
Clearly many people were worried and offended by what they saw. I want to reassure them that we take the views of our audience very seriously and profoundly regret any offence that may have been caused. On behalf of the board the Chief Executive and I have commissioned a review of the editorial and compliance processes that support Big Brother. The board will receive a full report and seek to identify any lessons that can be learned for the future. The programme remains on air for a further week and the channel is focused on its completion. We are expecting to hear from Ofcom in the near future detailing the nature and number of complaints they have received and requesting a formal response to their questions. Our own review will also help support this process. All board members of Channel 4 abhor racism. We are also committed to ensuring that the channel continues to fulfil its remit to explore important social issues.

 Viewership 
The launch show of Celebrity Big Brother (aired on 3 January 2007) averaged 7.1 million viewers, and ratings fell to 3.9 million by 7 January. Ratings quickly rose as media coverage reported alleged racism towards Shilpa from fellow female contestants; the episode which aired on 16 January 2007 saw a ratings boost with the show sharing 18% of the available audience and ratings of 4.5 million viewers. The episode the following night also rose in ratings, with 5.2 million viewers. The ratings once again rose on Jade's eviction night to an average of 7.8 million viewers, and a peak of 8.8 million viewers, which were the highest viewing figures in the history of Celebrity Big Brother' and second for any Big Brother show after the Big Brother 3 finale, which landed a record 10 million viewers. The Big Brother 3 final night was the same night that Jade left the house for the first time back in 2002.

 Investigation 
 Police 
After Shetty confided in Cleo Rocos that she thought the conflicts within the House could be racially motivated, her words compelled police to investigate whether or not to classify her treatment as 'racial hatred' under Part III of the Public Order Act 1986.
 
On Thursday 18 January, Hertfordshire Police released the following statement:
Hertfordshire Constabulary is investigating allegations of racist behaviour in the Big Brother house and will be conducting enquiries, including a review of the tapes. We will continue to liaise with Ofcom and with Endemol, whom we have strongly encouraged to ensure that any form of behaviour that could raise similar concerns, does not occur. We will continue to closely monitor the situation over the next few days. Hertfordshire Constabulary will not tolerate racism in any form and is taking these allegations seriously. The constabulary has experience of investigating and resolving incidents in the Big Brother house in past seasons.
 
Police also confirmed they had spoken to Goody and her mother Budden, stating:
An investigation into allegations of racist behaviour inside the Celebrity Big Brother house is continuing. Hertfordshire Constabulary can confirm police will be making approaches to speak to housemates if and when appropriate once they have left the house. We are also making contact with two of the housemates who have already been evicted but at this stage no interviews have taken place.

On 1 February, three days after the series concluded, an anonymous handwritten note was handed to the police, written on the back of a production schedule for an episode of Big Brother's Little Brother, alleging that footage existed of some housemates singing a "racist song" featuring the word "paki". Channel 4 confirmed that police would require a "court order" to see unbroadcast footage of the show. Ultimately, it transpired that untransmitted footage did exist, featuring some housemates creating a limerick about Shetty. The word "paki" was never actually used, but referred to.
 
On 9 March 2007, police stated that no formal charges would be brought against any of the participants of Celebrity Big Brother, stating:
 
[Channel 4] declined to co-operate and stated they would contest any application to court [...] Following consultation with the Crown Prosecution Service, it was felt that it would not be in the public interest to effect arrests or to pursue footage through the courts. The CPS has concluded that whilst what occurred was clearly offensive, it was not criminal.
 
The police also confirmed that, without specifying names, they had interviewed four housemates in relation to the controversy, while two others "would not speak to them".

 Ofcom 
Regulatory authority Ofcom announced its intention to conduct the investigation into the viewer complaints about the series, and continued after the conclusion of the criminal investigation. Channel 4 made its submission to Ofcom in April. Channel 4 was criticised for the announcement and promotion of its eighth series of Big Brother before the investigation had concluded, with Ofcom stating that it was "aware of the benefits" of announcing its findings before the new series began.
 
Ofcom's Adjudication of Findings was published on 24 May 2007. After examining a large number of events throughout the series, it decided that the broadcast of three events in particular had breached Ofcom's Broadcasting Code:
 
 Jo O'Meara and Danielle Lloyd's remarks about cooking in India
 Danielle Lloyd's "Fuck off home" comment
 Jade Goody's "Shilpa Poppadom" comment
 
It also decided that, while Jackiey Budden's use of the expression "The Indian" was "deeply offensive", the circumstances and Channel 4's response led Ofcom to consider this matter resolved.
 
Channel Four also confidentially supplied Ofcom with uncensored and untransmitted material from the programme. Firstly, this clarified Jack Tweed's use of the word "cunt", and not the word "Paki" which had been reported. However, this also revealed conversations that took place between Goody, Lloyd, O'Meara and Tweed on Tuesday 16 January 2007, a few hours after the "Oxo cube" row between Goody and Shetty. In the first conversation, they discussed whether "the P word" had been used by any housemate (which Jack clarified by saying "It rhymes with tacky"). In subsequent conversations, they created limericks which featured the rhyming words "tacky", "happy", "nappy", "crappy", "yappy" and "strappy". These conversations, which were never broadcast, led to Big Brother issuing formal warnings to O'Meara and Tweed in the Diary Room, threatening immediate ejection from the House if their behaviour recurred.
 
Channel Four clarified that Brighter Pictures, the production company that supplies Big Brother to the channel, had suppressed the footage and logged the material under the heading "racist". However, Ofcom responded that although Channel Four were unaware of the material, it highlighted a significant breakdown in communication between it and the producers, meaning that they were "not in possession of all the relevant facts and as a result, failed to maintain proper control over their programme".
 
As a result of broadcasting the three offending scenes, repeating one of them in early morning syndication and for their failing to be aware of what was happening in the House at a critical time, Ofcom decided to impose an official sanction on the network, directing them to broadcast a statement of their findings three times during the broadcast of Big Brother 8.
 
On the same day as Ofcom published their findings, Channel 4 issued a press statement accepting the verdict, with Chief Executive Andy Duncan stating:We accept Ofcom's judgement that on the occasions in question we did not ensure that Big Brother intervened with the necessary promptness or strength. We would like to say sorry once again for the offence caused to viewers as a result. Ofcom did not rule this material should not have been broadcast, but that we should have done more to contextualise it by challenging and reprimanding the offending housemates. We believe the initiatives we have announced will help prevent a repeat of the public offence caused by the programme.

Aftermath
Channel 4 and Big Brother
In addition to Ofcom's investigation of the series, Channel 4 also commissioned its own internal review of the events of the series. It concluded that: "[...] great offence was caused by the broadcast of several comments made by housemates, irrespective of their motivation.  Channel 4 appeared to be somehow condoning the behaviour of some of the housemates because interventions were felt to be too late or insufficiently forceful." Subsequently, the network agreed to change and improve their compliance systems, introduce an "additional editorial perspective", "acknowledge and contribute to public debate provoked by its programmes" and update the Big Brother rules. However, the review also commented on what it described as the "hostile" media coverage of the programme, and denied that Channel 4 had "deliberately engineered" tension in the House between Shetty and her housemates.
 
Nine days into the eighth series of Big Brother, and exactly two weeks after Ofcom and Channel 4's separate findings were published, contestant Emily Parr was removed from the Big Brother House following her use of the term "nigger" during a conversation with another housemate. Subsequently, Channel 4 was praised by several sources.
 Celebrity Big Brother did not air in 2008, after Channel 4 decided to "rest" the format. It was replaced by Big Brother: Celebrity Hijack, before Celebrity Big Brother returned in January 2009. The contestants were spoken to "in detail" about the controversy, and how to avoid a repeat incident. On 26 August 2009, just before the conclusion of the tenth series of Big Brother, Channel 4 announced that it would not be renewing its contract with Endemol to screen Big Brother after its end in 2010. The rights were bought by Channel 5, who broadcast the program for seven years before deciding not to renew their contract with Endemol in 2018.

Since the controversy, and following the removal of Parr in the eighth series, Big Brother has continued to have a zero-tolerance policy on the use of any potentially offensive or discriminatory language – either on the programme or in public before it – resulting in the removal of several Housemates. These have included Ken Morley, Christopher Biggins, Rodrigo Alves, Tila Tequila, Andrew Tate and Ellis Hillon.

Contestants
After she was evicted from the House, Jade Goody made several appearances in the media, such as an interview with News of the World, and appearances on Big Brother's Little Brother and The Wright Stuff, during which she apologised profusely for her behaviour on the programme, and confirmed that her fee for appearing on Celebrity Big Brother was being donated to charity. She maintained that she was not racist, but understood how her comments could have been interpreted as such. On 29 January, she was admitted to Priory Hospital for issues relating to mental health. She made few public appearances over the course of 2007. In 2008, she was offered a place on the second series of India's version of Big Brother, entitled Bigg Boss, which she accepted. The series was presented by her former housemate, and subject of the racism controversy, Shilpa Shetty, and the two were reunited on the launch night of the show. Two days into the series, Goody was forced to leave the Bigg Boss House, after receiving a call from her doctor indicating that she had been diagnosed with cervical cancer. She released her second and final autobiography in September 2008, entitled Catch a Falling Star. Her condition continued to worsen over the next few months and, in February 2009, she was informed that her cancer was terminal. She died on 22 March 2009.

Jo O'Meara, like Goody, was treated for mental health issues after she left the House. She gave an interview in which she described suicidal thoughts. In a statement on 1 February, she apologised for her behaviour, and also discussed her introduction into the house, her eviction, her interview with Davina McCall and the death threats she had received. A year later, she gave birth to a son. In 2015, she took part in an S Club 7 reunion, and continues to work in animal rights activism.

Danielle Lloyd faced less hostility upon her eviction from the House, and continued to be a prominent figure in the media over the course of 2007 and 2008. In May 2007, she threatened to sue Endemol for unfair editing, and to make her own complaint to Ofcom. In 2017, Lloyd addressed the controversy in an episode of In Therapy.

Shilpa Shetty, during her interview with McCall after being announced as the winner of the show, said:

"Things happen, people make mistakes and we all learn from them. But I can say one thing for sure. Jade didn't mean to be racist. She isn't a racist. I really don't want to leave England putting anyone in trouble. This country has given me so much. I just want to thank all of Great Britain for giving me this fantastic opportunity to make my country proud."

In May 2007, her next film, entitled Life in A... Metro became the first Bollywood film to premiere in Leicester Square. A year later, following Goody's brief appearance on Bigg Boss, Shetty announced that she had forgiven her. She married Raj Kundra in 2009. Shetty went on to judge the reality show Nach Baliye'' in 2012.

References 

2007 controversies
2007 in British television
Anti-Indian sentiment
Big Brother (British TV series)
Bullying in television
Discrimination in the United Kingdom
Racism in the United Kingdom
Race-related controversies in television
Scandals in the United Kingdom
Television controversies in the United Kingdom
January 2007 events in the United Kingdom